The 2019 Campbell Fighting Camels football team represented Campbell University in the 2019 NCAA Division I FCS football season. They were led by seventh-year head coach Mike Minter and played their home games at Barker–Lane Stadium. They were second-year members of the Big South Conference. They finished the season 6–5, 3–3 in Big South play to finish in fourth place.

Previous season

The Fighting Camels finished the 2018 season 6–5, 1–4 in Big South play to finish in fifth place.

Preseason

Big South poll
In the Big South preseason poll released on July 21, 2019, the Camels were predicted to finish in fourth place.

Preseason All–Big South team
The Fighting Camels had seven players selected to the preseason all-Big South team.

Offense

Caleb Snead – WR

Michael Wooten – TE

Jacob Cuddington – OL

Matt Price – OL

Defense

Damien Dozier – DL

Dorian Jones – DB

Special teams

Brad Dennis – P

Schedule

Game summaries

at Troy

Shaw

Davidson

at Mercer

Presbyterian

Hampton

at Gardner–Webb

at North Alabama

Kennesaw State

Monmouth

at Charleston Southern

References

Campbell
Campbell Fighting Camels football seasons
Campbell Fighting Camels football